is a Japanese television jidaigeki or period drama that was broadcast between 1972 and 1974. It was inspired by Akira Kurosawa's Sanjuro and the Western genre. The lead star is Toshiro Mifune. The complete DVD box was released in 2007.

Plot

Cast
 Toshiro Mifune as Tōge Kujūrō
 Meiko Kaji as Ofumi (season1)
 Mayumi Ogawa as Oryu (season1)
 Jirō Sakagami as Jirokichi
 Shun Oide

Season
1st (1972–73) 65 episodes
2nd (1974) 39 episodes

References

1972 Japanese television series debuts
1970s drama television series
Jidaigeki television series